The City of Hume is a local government area located within the metropolitan area of Melbourne, Victoria, Australia. It includes the outer north-western suburbs and a number of rural localities between 13 and 40 kilometres from the Melbourne city centre.

It has an area of 504 square kilometres, and in June 2018 it had a population of 224,394. The City was formed on 15 December 1994 after the amalgamation of most of the City of Broadmeadows, the Shire of Bulla and parts of the City of Keilor and City of Whittlesea.

The City is unique in Australia in that it was the first local government to introduce a Bill of Rights for its denizens in 2004, following the establishment of a Social Justice Charter in 2001. This Bill of Rights predates the State Government's Charter of Rights and Responsibilities by three years, and is more sweeping in that it explicitly includes economic, social, and cultural rights.

Hume Eagles play rugby league in NRL Victoria.

Council

Current composition and election method

Since 2012, Hume has been divided into three wards – Aitken, Jacksons Creek and Meadow Valley — each of which elect a total of 11 Councillors:
 Aitken Ward (4 Councillors)
 Jacksons Creek Ward (3 Councillors)
 Meadow Valley Ward (4 Councillors)

Council elections are counted using single transferable vote. Voting is compulsory for residents who are on the voters' roll for local council elections, but voters aged 70 years or over are not obliged to vote at local council elections. The Mayor is a serving councillor, chosen annually by councillors. The most recent council election was held in October 2020. The next election will take place in October 2024.

2020–2024

Townships and localities
The 2021 census, the city had a population of 243,901 up from 197,376 in the 2016 census

^ - Territory divided with another LGA

See also
 List of places on the Victorian Heritage Register in the City of Hume

References

External links
 
Official Website
Metropolitan local area maps Public Transport Victoria local public transport maps]
Link to Land Victoria interactive maps

Local government areas of Melbourne
Greater Melbourne (region)
 
Hume Highway
1994 establishments in Australia
Populated places established in 1994